The women's team artistic swimming competition at the 2014 Asian Games in Incheon was held on 21 and 22 September at the Munhak Park Tae-hwan Aquatics Center.

Schedule
All times are Korea Standard Time (UTC+09:00)

Results 
Legend
FR — Reserve in free
RR — Reserve in technical and free
TR — Reserve in technical

References

External links
Official Website

Artistic swimming at the 2014 Asian Games